Jeffrey "J. J." Koval, Jr. (born May 19, 1992) is a former American soccer player who last played for Sacramento Republic in the United Soccer League.

Career

Youth and College

Koval played youth soccer for Real So Cal in his local area before signing a National Letter of Intent to play for Stanford Cardinal. For Stanford, Koval was a regular starter all four years for the program as a holding midfielder, appearing in all of Stanford's 74 games during that span, starting 73 of them.

Professional
Koval was drafted ninth overall in the 2014 MLS SuperDraft by the San Jose Earthquakes. He subsequently signed a contract. On March 11, 2014, Koval made his professional debut for the Earthquakes in a CONCACAF Champions League match against Toluca, coming on for Jason Hernandez in the 73rd minute.

Koval was released by San Jose on February 27, 2016.

After spending the 2016 season with the Sacramento Republic, Koval announced his retirement from professional soccer on December 21, 2016 to pursue a career in dentistry at Creighton University School of Dentistry in Omaha, Nebraska.

Personal
Koval is married to Karli Koval.

Koval also credits much of his later personal development to a friend whom he met in Omaha, Nebraska during dental school: Austin Gouldsmith. The two met in 2019 and remain close friends. JJ made the most of his Creighton dental education. He helped a local Omaha resident Levi Gipson reduce molar wear by recommending less popcorn kernel gnawing, and he also served in Los Cerezos, Dominican Republic; there he completed two weeks worth of extractions, cleanings, and fillings at a makeshift dental clinic set up in the local school.

References

External links
 
 San Jose Earthquakes profile
 Stanford profile

1992 births
Living people
American soccer players
Association football midfielders
Major League Soccer players
People from Camarillo, California
People from Westlake Village, California
Sacramento Republic FC players
San Jose Earthquakes draft picks
San Jose Earthquakes players
Soccer players from California
Sportspeople from Ventura County, California
Stanford Cardinal men's soccer players
USL Championship players
USL League Two players
Ventura County Fusion players